Thomas Fabrice Som (born 5 August 1988) is a Cameroonian footballer who plays as a defender for Borgo San Donnino.

Career
Som started his career at Italy for Crociati Noceto, located at Noceto, the Province of Parma. In January 2005, he signed a youth contract with Parma, where he started to play as a forward. He was awarded no.27 shirt of the first team in 2007–08 season. In July 2008, he left Parma's Primavera under-20 team and joined Lega Pro Seconda Divisione side Carpenedolo along with Fabio Virgili, where he made 28 league appearances. In July 2009, he joined Pro Patria in a co-ownership deal for a peppercorn of €500. But after a few appearances at Prima Divisione, he joined fellow third division club and league struggler Pergocrema on loan.

In September 2011, Som was signed by Como as free agent. In June 2012, he joined Serie B club Grosseto.

References

External links
 Profile at AIC.Football.it 
 
 
 

Cameroonian footballers
Crociati Noceto players
Parma Calcio 1913 players
Aurora Pro Patria 1919 players
U.S. Pergolettese 1932 players
Como 1907 players
F.C. Grosseto S.S.D. players
Benevento Calcio players
Lynx F.C. players
Serie B players
Association football defenders
Cameroonian expatriate footballers
Expatriate footballers in Italy
Cameroonian expatriate sportspeople in Italy
1988 births
Living people